Jasmina Milovanović (born 1 March 1987) is a Serbian sports shooter. She competed in the women's 10 metre air pistol and women's 25 metre pistol events at the 2020 Summer Olympics.

References

External links
 

1987 births
Living people
Serbian female sport shooters
Olympic shooters of Serbia
Shooters at the 2020 Summer Olympics
European champions for Serbia
Sportspeople from Belgrade